Olı Mäñgär is a rural locality (a selo) in Ätnä District, Tatarstan. The population was 680 as of 2010.

Geography 
Olı Mäñgär is located 8 km east of Olı Ätnä, district's administrative centre, and 163 km northeast of Qazan, republic's capital, by road.

History 
The village existed already during the period of the Khanate of Qazan.

From 17th to first half of the 19th centuries village's residents belonged to the social estate of state peasants.

The population of Olı Mäñgär reached its peak of about 1900 inhabitants in 1897. By the beginning of the twentieth century, village had 3 mosques, 2 mektebs, 7 inns, 2 windmills and 3 watermills, 3 smithy, 4 small shops and a bazaar on Tuesdays.

Before the creation of Tatar ASSR in 1920 was a part of Qazan Uyezd of Qazan Governorate. Since 1920 was a part of Arça Canton; after creation of districts in Tatar ASSR (Tatarstan) in Tuqay (later Ätnä) (1930–1959), Tuqay (former Qızıl Yul) (1959–1963), Arça (1963–1990) and Ätnä districts.

Notable objects 
 Wäliulla Bäkeref's house.

Notable people 
Olı Mäñgär is a birthplace of two Tatar Soviet architects, Äxmät Bikçäntäyef and İsmäğil Ğäynetdinef,  a poet, Bari Abdullin, the 2nd secretary Tatarstan Regional Committee of the VKP(b), Hero of Socialist Labour, Nazlıgöl Latıypova, Honored Artist of the Tatar ASSR.

References

External links 
 

Rural localities in Atninsky District